Eustace is a given and family name.

Eustace may also refer to:

Eustace, Texas, USA
Eustace Independent School District
Eustace (narrowboat), a boat in the West Country Living Museum, England
Bishop Eustace Preparatory School, New Jersey
Eustace Hall, a campus building at Michigan State University
Eustace, a main character in the animated series Courage the Cowardly Dog